Ditellurium decafluoride was widely reported in the literature but what was believed to be Te2F10 has been shown to be bis(pentafluorotelluryl) oxide, F5TeOTeF5.  An account as to how this error occurred was made by P. M. Watkins.

If it existed, it would be valence isoelectronic with disulfur decafluoride, and have a similar structure.

References

Tellurium compounds
Fluorides
Nonmetal halides
Chalcohalides
Hypothetical chemical compounds